Dumitru Velicu (26 October 1930 – 1997) was a Romanian equestrian and Olympic medalist. He was born in Râmnicu Vâlcea. He competed in dressage at the 1980 Summer Olympics in Moscow, where he won a bronze medal with the Romanian team, along with Anghelache Donescu and Petre Roşca. He placed twelfth in individual dressage at the 1980 Olympics.

References

External links

1930 births
1997 deaths
Sportspeople from Râmnicu Vâlcea
Romanian male equestrians
Romanian dressage riders
Olympic equestrians of Romania
Olympic bronze medalists for Romania
Equestrians at the 1980 Summer Olympics
Olympic medalists in equestrian
Medalists at the 1980 Summer Olympics